The following is a list of the mountains and hills of Arizona, ordered by height.

Entries in bold indicate the peak is the highest point in its respective county.

Entries with a † indicate the peak has a low topographic prominence and may be considered a subpeak to a higher nearby summit.

Mountains over 12000 feet

Mountains over 11000 feet

Mountains over 10000 feet

Mountains over 9000 feet

Mountains over 8000 feet

Mountains over 7000 feet

Mountains over 6000 feet

Mountains over 5000 feet

Mountains over 4000 feet

Mountains over 3000 feet

Mountains over 2000 feet

Mountains over 1000 feet

Notable hills – under 1000 feet

See also

 List of mountains of the United States
 List of mountain peaks of the United States
 List of mountain ranges of the United States
 List of mountain peaks of Arizona
 List of mountain ranges of Arizona

External links
 U.S. Board on Geographic Names
 
 Arizona County High Points
 Arizona Mountain Range High Points

Mountain Peaks
Arizona